The 1991 Australian Under-21 Individual Speedway Championship was the 5th running of the Australian Under-21 Individual Speedway Championship organised by Motorcycling Australia. The final took place on 6 January 1991 at the Olympic Park Speedway in Mildura, Victoria. The championship was won by Mildura's own Leigh Adams who won the third of his four national Under-21 championships. Shane Parker from Adelaide was second with another Mildura rider Jason Lyons in third place. Parker defeated Lyons in a run-off for the minor placings after both finished the meeting on 13 points. Former South Australian champion Scott Norman defeated Dave Hamnett from New South Wales in a run-off for fourth place after both finished the meeting on 11 points.

1991 Australian Under-21 Solo Championship
 6 January 1991
  Mildura, Victoria – Olympic Park Speedway
 Referee:

References

Books

See also
 Australia national speedway team
 Sport in Australia

Speedway in Australia
Australia
Individual Under-21 Speedway Championship
Sport in Mildura